"Hotel Happiness" is a song written by Leon Carr and Earl Shuman and performed by Brook Benton featuring The Merry Melody Singers.  It reached #2 on the U.S. R&B chart, #3 on the U.S. pop chart, and #6 on the Cashbox chart in 1963.

The single's B-side, "Still Water Runs Deep", reached #81 on the Cashbox chart and #89 on the U.S. pop chart.

The song was arranged by Jerry Kennedy and produced by Shelby Singleton.

Other versions
Dora Hall released a version of the song as the B-side to her 1963 single "Did He Call Today, Mama?"
Jumpin' Gene Simmons released a version of the song on his 1964 album Jumpin' Gene Simmons.
Jimmy Smith released a version of the song on his 1967 album I'm Movin' On.
The Persuasions released a version of the song on their 1993 album Toubo's Song.
Mountain released a version of the song on their 1996 album Man's World.

References

Songs about hotels and motels
1962 songs
1962 singles
Songs with music by Leon Carr
Brook Benton songs
Mountain (band) songs
Mercury Records singles
Songs with lyrics by Earl Shuman